Sphaerophoria sulphuripes, the forked globetail, is a species of syrphid flies in the family Syrphidae native to Western North America.

References

Further reading

External links

 Diptera.info
 NCBI Taxonomy Browser, Sphaerophoria sulphuripes

Syrphini
Diptera of North America
Insects described in 1869